Jin Sun-Kuk (also transliterated Jin Seon-Guk; born 25 October 1970) is a South Korean former track and field sprinter who competed in the 100 metres.

He represented his country at the 1996 Atlanta Olympics and the World Championships in Athletics in 1991 and 1993 (failing to pass beyond the first round on each occasion). He won the South Korean national title in the 100 m in 1997.

His personal best of 10.23 seconds came at the 1993 East Asian Games, which brought him the gold medal and a games record.

References

External links

Living people
1970 births
South Korean male sprinters
Athletes (track and field) at the 1996 Summer Olympics
Olympic athletes of South Korea
20th-century South Korean people